Maltby is a civil parish in the Metropolitan Borough of Rotherham, South Yorkshire, England.  The parish contains 40 listed buildings that are recorded in the National Heritage List for England.  Of these, one is listed at Grade I, the highest of the three grades, three are at Grade II*, the middle grade, and the others are at Grade II, the lowest grade.  The parish contains the town of Maltby and a large area to the southeast of the town.  This area includes the country house of Sandbeck Park, which is listed together with a number of associated buildings and structures.  Also in the area is Roche Abbey, and items in its grounds are listed.  The other listed buildings include houses and cottages, a church and a tomb in the churchyard, a market cross, former watermills, farmhouses and farm buildings, mileposts, and a war memorial.


Key

Buildings

References

Citations

Sources

 

Lists of listed buildings in South Yorkshire
Buildings and structures in the Metropolitan Borough of Rotherham